The Northern Ireland women's national under-19 football team represents the female under-19s of Northern Ireland in the UEFA Women's Under-19 Championship, and is controlled by the Irish Football Association.

History

Current squad

See also 

 Northern Ireland women's national football team

 Northern Ireland women's national under-17 football team

References

External links
Official website

under-19
Women's national under-19 association football teams